John D. Raffaelli is an American lobbyist born in Texarkana, Texas. He is the Founder and a partner in the Washington, DC, based lobbying firm Capitol Counsel LLC.

Education
Raffaelli holds a B.S. degree in business administration from American University, a L.L.M. degree in taxation from New York University Law School and a J.D. degree from the University of Arkansas School of Law.

Career
He is one of the "Top 50 lobbyists" in Washington, according to The Washingtonian magazine. The Hill newspaper called him "one of the most experienced Democratic tax lobbyists in Washington" and one "of the best lobbyists for hire in town".

Charitable activities
Raffaelli was on the board of Susan G. Komen Race for the Cure.

References

External links 
 Capitol Counsel

American lobbyists
Living people
Year of birth missing (living people)